The London Coal Exchange was situated on the north side of Thames Street in the City of London, nearly opposite to Old Billingsgate Market, occupying three different structures from 1770 to 1962.  The original coal exchange opened in 1770.  A second building from 1805 was replaced by a new purpose-built structure constructed from 1847 to 1849, and opened by Prince Albert on 30 October 1849.  This third London coal exchange was one of the first substantial buildings constructed from cast iron, built several years before the hall at the Great Exhibition.  It was demolished in 1962 to allow widening of what is now Lower Thames Street despite a campaign by the Victorian Society to save the building.  Cast iron decorations from the 1849 Coal Exchange building were selected as the model for the dragon boundary mark for the main entrances to the City of London.

Background

Coal had been imported to London by sea since at least medieval times.  A coal exchange was established in 1770 on Thames Street in the City of London, near the site of Smart's Quay and close to Billingsgate Market; the main trades at Billingsgate Dock were fish and coal.  The market was established by the main coal merchants as a private body to regulate the trade of coal in the capital, and was controlled by private coal merchants until the old Coal Exchange was bought by the Corporation of London in 1807.  A new building had been built in 1805, with a recessed classical portico supported by small Doric pillars and triangular pediment above, with stone steps leading to a quadrangle within.  Under the control of the City Corporation, the Coal Exchange became a free and open market, regulated by various Acts of Parliament, including Acts in 1831, 1838 and 1845.

At this period, London was heated almost entirely by coal.  By 1848, approximately 3.5 million tons of coal was being transported each year from the coalfields in Northumberland and Durham to London, with over 12,000 shiploads carried on nearly 3,000 vessels. The coal trade was also an important source of tax revenue for the city. The duty on coal funded Wren's rebuilding of more than fifty city churches and St Paul's Cathedral after the Great Fire of London in 1666, and also funded for other building works in the metropolis, such as the Thames Embankment.

Historically, coal taxes, payable on each chaldron of 35 bushels or the imperial ton) were charged by the City based on volume measurements. A public measurement system, called metage, prevailed.  Officials, called sea meters, measured the coal delivered from ship tp barge; others, called land meters, measured coal into standard sacks at the quayside.  Monies owing to vendors, and to the Crown and City for taxes, were calculated with reference to the metage.  "Metage" could also referred to the public charge payable for the meter man performing his duty.

A coal duty of 4 pence was confirmed by James I, with a duty of 8 pence more added under William III and Mary II, and an additional 1 pence added to fund the construction of the new Coal Exchange. From 1831, the City of London charged a duty of 13 pence per imperial ton before coal could be unshipped, and a certificate was sent to the Coal Exchange stating the date of shipment, name and owner of the ship, quantity of coal, where it was mined, and the price paid. The coal trade was dominated by sea transport until 1845, but railway transportation increased in importance in the 1850s and 1860s, with similar quantities carried on the rails, and the coal duty was extended to coal brought within 20 miles of London by any means in 1862. By 1875, five million tons of coal were being brought to London each year by rail and three million tons by sea.

Thousands of workmen of various grades were employed to move the coal from the ships to a customer's coal cellar, with "coal-whippers" hauling baskets of coal out of the hold of a collier with a rope and pulley system into a coal merchant's lighter, and then taken onshore by "coal-backers".  The coal was sorted by "coal-sifter" and put into coal-sacks by a "coal-filler", then transported by "coal-waggoners" and delivered by a "coal-trimmer".  The work was heavy manual labour, but the trade was essential and workers were reasonably well paid for the period.

In the Coal Exchange, coal factors acted as agents between sellers and buyers. Factors agreed with coal sellers how much coal is available on a particular day, based on the ships available and the market price, with the market meeting on Mondays, Wednesdays and Fridays from 12 noon to 2:30 pm.  All sales were agreed privately, with no public auction, and factors would take a 0.5% commission.

By 1845, a petition was made to build a new exchange, and the City Clerk of Works, James Bunstone Bunning, produced a design.  Construction started in December 1847 and the new Coal Exchange was formally opened by Prince Albert on 30 October 1849. The Lord Mayor and City MP, James Duke, was made a baronet in honour of the occasion.

Description

The new Coal Exchange was built on the north side of Thames Street, on the east side of its junction with St. Mary-at-Hill, with four floors. A Roman hypocaust was found during the excavation of the building's foundations, part of the Roman house at Billingsgate, and preserved in its basement and is now a scheduled monument.

Within the tower was a staircase providing access to the upper floors. The ground floor portico provided access to an entrance vestibule leading to a large central circular vaulted hall.

The dome design was based on that of the Bourse de commerce of Paris by François-Joseph Bélanger and François Brunet, completed in 1811. The dome was decorated with "Raphaelesque" encaustic panels by Frederick Sang on a coal-related theme, depicting fossils of ferns, palms and other plants, and images of collieries and mining operations, and views of North Shields, Sunderland, Newcastle upon Tyne and Durham together, with cast iron decorative features.  The piers also supported three tiers of cast iron galleries which opened on to offices around the exterior of the building which were occupied by coal factors and other agents and merchants connected with the coal trade.

Demolition
The building suffered some damage in the Second World War, and it ceased to be used as a coal exchange after the war when the coal industry was nationalised.  It was then used as offices, but the City of London did not proceed with plans to refurbish the building in the 1950s because its demolition had been suggested to allow widening of the road from Blackfriars to the East End, and it became progressively more dilapidated.  Nonetheless, in the 1950s, Professor Richard Hitchcock described it as "the prime city monument of the early Victorian period".  In September 1956, John Betjeman (a founding member of the Victorian Society and a passionate defender of Victorian architecture) gave a speech to the Society for the Protection of Ancient Buildings in the rotunda of the Coal Exchange to argue for its preservation.  It became a Grade 2 listed building in 1958.  A letter published in The Times and signed by Walter Gropius, Sigfried Giedion, Josep Lluís Sert and Eduard Sekler described the Coal Exchange as "a landmark in the history of early iron construction".

Various alternatives were proposed.  The Georgian Group and the Victorian Society both favoured preservation of the Coal Exchange, even if that meant that the "very dull, plain and ordinary" rear parts of the nearby Grade-1 listed Custom House (then the headquarters of HM Customs & Excise) were removed.  Others suggested a scheme in which a walkway would be added in arches under the Coal Exchange.  There was also a suggestion that the dome could become part of the new Royal School of Music in the Barbican, or shipped to Australia to become part of the National Gallery of Victoria in Melbourne, but funds were not available.

MP Tom Driberg made a speech in an adjournment debate in February 1961, quoting a statement by Sir Mortimer Wheeler published in The Times the previous day, saying that "Professor Pevsner has placed the threatened London Coal Exchange among the twelve irreplaceable buildings of 19th century England ... It expresses an era of urban revolution as no other surviving building is capable of doing ... The Coal Exchange is a national monument in the fullest sense of the phrase, and its destruction would be unforgivable."

The Corporation was uncooperative, and declined to allow any respite. One member remarked that "We cannot spend time on the preservation of a Victorian building".
 
Despite campaigns and protests, it was demolished in November 1962 to make way for a "vital" widening of Lower Thames Street.  The demolition of the Coal Exchange was described by author Hermione Hobhouse as "one of the great conservationist horror stories" and its loss has been compared to the demolition of the Adelphi in 1936 and of Euston Arch shortly before, in 1961.  The cleared site was then left empty for 10 years while other land was acquired for the road widening scheme.

Cast iron dragons which were mounted on the eaves parapet above the entrance to the Coal Exchange were preserved and were erected as dragon boundary marks in October 1963 in Temple Gardens on Victoria Embankment.  Half-sized replicas were erected at the other main entrances to the City, in preference to the more fierce dragon at Temple Bar.

See also
Coal-tax post

References

Sources

 London, 1808-1870: The Infernal Wen, Francis Henry Wollaston Sheppard, pp. 192–195
 Public sculpture of the city of London, Philip Ward-Jackson, pp. 422–423
 Hand-book of London: past and present, Peter Cunningham, pp. 130–131
 Politics and Preservation: A Policy History of the Built Heritage 1882-1996, John Delafons, pp. 83–84
 Engraving of the old Coal Exchange in the 1830s
 Hansard, House of Commons debates, 9 February 1961, vol 634 cc783-94
 Knight's cyclopædia of London, 1851 edited by Charles Knight, pp. 492–497
 Lower Thames Street, Old and New London: Volume 2 (1878), pp. 41–60
 London Coal Exchange, victorianlondon.org
 Photograph of the Coal Exchange, Courtauld Institute
 Images of the Coal Exchange from the City of London archive
 Image of the new Coal Exchange from the River Thames, behind Billingsgate Market and the Customs House
 The opening of the new Coal Exchange by Prince Albert of Saxe-Coburg-Gotha, National Portrait Gallery, engraving published 1851
 Hansard, House of Commons debates, 22 May 1889, vol 336 cc701-67 (description of the coal duties in London)
 A sense of history, RIBAjournal.com, 2011

Buildings and structures demolished in 1962
Coal industry
Commercial buildings completed in 1805
Commercial buildings completed in 1849
Commodity exchanges in the United Kingdom
Defunct financial services companies of the United Kingdom
Demolished buildings and structures in London
Financial services companies of the United Kingdom
Former buildings and structures in the City of London
1805 establishments in England
1849 establishments in England